The 2018 Colombian Women's Football League season (officially known as the 2018 Liga Águila Femenina season for sponsorship reasons) is the second season of Colombia's top-flight women's football league. The season started on 10 February and concluded on 31 May 2018. Santa Fe were the defending champions.

The two-legged final was played between Atlético Huila and debutants Atlético Nacional. Atlético Huila were the champions after tying Atlético Nacional 2–2 in aggregate score and beating them 3–0 in the penalty shootout, and qualified for the 2018 Copa Libertadores Femenina.

Format
Starting from this season, the league was expanded from 18 to 23 teams, which competed in four double round-robin groups, three of six teams each and one of five teams. The top two teams in each group moved on to the quarterfinals, with the winners advancing to the semifinals. The winners of each semifinal played the finals, which determined the champions. All rounds in the knockout stage were played on a home-and-away basis. The champions qualified for the 2018 Copa Libertadores Femenina and will also play the 2017–18 Primera División Femenina champions in a double-legged series, same as last season.

Teams 
23 teams took part in the competition. The teams are affiliated with DIMAYOR affiliate clubs. Atlético, Atlético Nacional, Bogotá, Deportes Tolima, and Junior competed for the first time.

Stadia and locations 

a: Played home games in Zipaquirá.
b: Played home games in Chiquinquirá.
c: Played home games in Cali.

First stage
The first stage started on 10 February and consisted of four round-robin hexagonals. It ended on 6 May with the top two teams from each group advancing to the knockout round.

Group A

Group B

Group C

Group D

Knockout phase

Bracket

Quarterfinals

|}

First leg

Second leg

Semifinals

|}

First leg

Second leg

Finals

Tied 2–2 on aggregate, Atlético Huila won 3–0 on penalties.

Top goalscorers

Source: Fémina Fútbol

See also
 Colombian Women's Football League

References

External links 
 Season at soccerway.com
 Dimayor's official website 

2018 in South American football leagues
2018 in Colombian football
2018
2018 in Colombian women's sport